Mladoňovice is a municipality and village in Chrudim District in the Pardubice Region of the Czech Republic. It has about 300 inhabitants.

Administrative parts
Villages of Čejkovice, Deblov, Lipina, Mýtka, Petříkovice, Pohled and Rtenín are administrative parts of Mladoňovice.

References

External links

Villages in Chrudim District